David Zane Mairowitz (born 1943 in New York City, United States), is a writer. He has written radio dramas, graphic novels, and nonfiction books & essays.

Mairowitz studied English literature and philosophy at Hunter College, New York; and drama at the University of California, Berkeley.

In 1966 he immigrated to England, where he worked as a freelance writer. He was one of the founding editors of International Times.

Since 1982 he has resided in southern France.

Works
 The Law Circus (1969), a play.
 BAMN: Outlaw Manifestos and Ephemera 1965–70 (1971), editor with Peter Stansill.
 Flash Gordon and the Angels (1971), a play.
 The Radical Soap Opera: Roots of Failure in the American Left (1974).
 The Stalin Sonata (1989), a radio drama.
 Dictator Gal (broadcast in 1992), a radio drama starring Josette Simon.
 Kafka for Beginners, also known as Introducing Kafka (1993), illustrated by Robert Crumb.
 Introducing Camus, illustrated by Alain Korkos.
 Graphic novel version of Franz Kafka's The Castle, illustrated by Czech artist and musician Jaromír 99 (Jaromír Švejdík).
 Love Tunnels: Getting Married in Las Vegas, a radio documentary broadcast in February 2021 on the CBC Radio programme Ideas.

References

External links
 David Zane Mairowitz Radio Dramas
 Articles on FindArticles.com
 "The Rose Revolution Shows its Thorns"
 "Outpost of the New Cold War"
 "Playing Intifada: the New Anti-Semitism in France"

1943 births
Living people
Hunter College alumni
University of California, Berkeley alumni
American emigrants to England
Writers from New York (state)
American emigrants to France